Yol (translated as The Way, The Road or The Path) is a 1982 Turkish film directed by Şerif Gören and Yılmaz Güney. The screenplay was written by Yılmaz Güney, and it was directed by his assistant Şerif Gören, as Güney was in prison at the time. Later, after Güney escaped from Imrali prison, he took the negatives of the film to Switzerland and later edited it in Paris.

The film is a portrait of Turkey in the aftermath of the 1980 Turkish coup d'état: its people and its authorities are shown via the stories of five prisoners given a week's home leave. The film has caused much controversy in Turkey, and was banned until 1999. However, it won numerous honours, including the Palme d'Or at the 1982 Cannes Film Festival.

Plot
In Turkey, several prisoners are granted temporary leave from prison. One, Seyit Ali (Tarık Akan), travels to his house and finds that his wife Zine (Şerif Sezer), to survive, has had to turn to prostitution. She was caught by her family and held captive for eight months in order for Seyit Ali to end her life in an honour killing. Though apparently determined at first, he changes his mind when his wife starts to freeze while travelling in the snow. Despite his efforts to keep her alive, he eventually fails. His wife's death relieves Seyit Ali from family pressure.

Another prisoner, Mehmet Salih (Halil Ergün) has been arrested for his role in a heist with his brother-in-law, whom he abandoned as he was being shot by police. His in-laws have disowned him, and he is finally forced to tell his wife Emine (Meral Orhonsay) the truth. Emine and Mehmet Salih decide to run away on a train. On the train, they are caught in the washroom about to have sex. They are saved from an angry mob by the train's officers and held in a cabin. A young boy from Emine's family who has boarded the train shoots both Mehmet Salih and Emine.

Ömer (Necmettin Çobanoğlu) returns to his village sitting near the border between Turkey and Syria, and arranges to cross the border to escape prison. Ömer finds his village in a battle between Kurdish smugglers and Turkish soldiers. Though Ömer is clearly determined, he gives up after his brother, who took part in the battle, is shot dead. Through his brother's death, Ömer has inherited the responsibility for his late brother's family and become husband to his late brother's wife, as dictated by tradition, despite his attraction to a young woman of the village.

Production
Güney wrote the screenplay, in part inspired by his own captivity, which contained elaborate detail, but could not personally direct as he was in prison. Güney initially recruited Erden Kiral as his surrogate director but, displeased with Kiral's work, had it destroyed and fired him. This became the basis of Kiral's later film, Yolda.

Güney subsequently hired Serif Gören. There were rumours that several prisoners, including Güney, watched much of Gören's footage on a wall at the prison. Güney later broke out of prison to edit Yol in Switzerland.

Zülfü Livaneli made the music for the movie, but due to political atmosphere then in Turkey, he used a pseudonym Sebastian Argol in order to avoid possible sanctions from Turkish courts which were then operating under 1980 Turkish coup d'état rules.

Controversies

Political controversy
The film was banned in Turkey because of its negative portrayal of Turkey at the time, which was under the control of a military dictatorship. Even more controversial was the limited use of the Kurdish language, music and culture (which were forbidden in Turkey at the time), as well as the portrayal of the hardships Kurds live through in Turkey. One scene in the movie even calls the location of Ömer's village "Kürdistan".

A new version of Yol was released in 2017, called Yol: The Full Version in which many of these controversial parts and scenes have been taken out, to make the film suitable for release in Turkey. In order to be shown at the Turkish stand at Cannes 2017 the Kürdistan insert was removed. In what critics say goes against the director Yılmaz Güney's wishes and call "censorship", the frame showing "Kürdistan" as well as a highly political scene where Ömer speaks about difficulties of being Kurdish were removed.

Another new version exists for the international market with all the politically controversial scenes included.

Rights dispute
The rights to Yol were disputed for a long time. Even during Yilmaz Güney's lifetime, there were major conflicts about the ownership of the film between Güney and Donat Keusch, the head of a Swiss-based service company called Cactus Film AG, who claimed to own the entire rights of the film. After Güney's death, the dispute escalated between Keusch and Güney's widow.

When Keusch filed for bankruptcy with his Cactus Film AG in 1999, the situation became even more complicated and resulted in numerous lawsuits in both Switzerland and France. There still are numerous sellers in the market claiming to be the sole owner of the world rights to Yol, and the film is offered in different versions through different distribution channels.

According to the bankruptcy office Zurich Aussersihl, Keusch received the rights which still remained in Cactus Film on March 4, 2010. This happened without payment. Keusch also sent this contract to the RCA-directory of the French CNC (film number 2010.2922) trying to use it as a proof that he had rights. In any case Keusch could only get from the bankruptcy office rights that cactus film had since no bankruptcy office can create non-existing rights.

Reception
Vincent Canby, writing for The New York Times, wrote that, although the film addressed significant issues, touching on these issues did not make it great art. Canby described it as "a large, decent, ponderous panorama". Time critic Richard Corliss declared Güney "a world-class moviemaker".

In 1982, director Werner Herzog said that Yol is "one of the films that has touched me so deeply — like barely anything else in the last ten years. It's just a masterpiece". In his 2015 Movie Guide, Leonard Maltin gave it three stars, describing it as "Incisive". In 2016, The Hollywood Reporter ranked it the 65th best film to win the Palme d'Or, saying the production was a better story than that on screen.

Accolades
The film won three honours at the 1982 Cannes Film Festival, tying for the top prize, the Palme d'Or, with Missing by Costa-Gavras. The film was selected as the Swiss entry for the Best Foreign Language Film at the 55th Academy Awards, but was not accepted as a nominee.

Further reading 
Yilmaz Güney's movie Yol within the Kurdish context of Turkey. A comparative study of different versions of Yol. Clara Francken

See also
 List of submissions to the 55th Academy Awards for Best Foreign Language Film
 List of Swiss submissions for the Academy Award for Best Foreign Language Film

References

External links 
 
 
 Filmpot page for the film

1982 films
1980s drama road movies
Turkish drama films
1980s Turkish-language films
Kurdish-language films
Palme d'Or winners
Films set in Turkey
Films directed by Yılmaz Güney
Films with screenplays by Zülfü Livaneli
Hyperlink films
1982 drama films
Kurdish culture in France
1982 multilingual films
Turkish multilingual films